Amoria benthalis is a species of sea snail, a marine gastropod mollusk in the family Volutidae, the volutes.

Description
The length of the shell varies between 28 mm and 43 mm.

McMicheal was the first to describe them in 1964:

"Shell small, robust, with short spire, the apex bluntly rounded, the suture glazed over; body whorl large, weakly shouldered. Protoconch of 2 whorls, smooth, highly polished, uniform creamish-brown, adult whorls 2½, colour cream, with an ill-defined brown band just beneath the suture and two spiral bands of brown spots, one at the shoulder and one half-way between this and the anterior end of the shell, and with numerous fine, longitudinal reddish-brown lines spaced about 1 or 2 mm apart, slightly undulating, with two peaks at the positions of the bands of brown spots; anterior end of shell suffused with brown. Aperture gaping, white to orange, with four strong plaits; fasciole weakly developed. Animal unknown"

Distribution
This marine species have been found off Australia, from Cape Moreton, Queensland, to Ballina, New South Wales. They live on muddy sand bottoms at depths of 146-229 m.

References

 Bail P. & Limpus A. (2001) The genus Amoria. In: G.T. Poppe & K. Groh (eds) A conchological iconography. Hackenheim: Conchbooks. 50 pp., 93 pls.

External links
 Gastropods.com: Amoria undulata benthalis (f)

Volutidae
Gastropods described in 1964